Victoria Road is a major road in Sydney, New South Wales, Australia, connecting Parramatta with the western end of Anzac Bridge and is currently one of the longest roads in Sydney. The road passes over two major bridges: the Iron Cove Bridge over Iron Cove, and the Gladesville Bridge over the Parramatta River.

Route
Victoria Road begins at the intersection with O'Connell Street in Paramatta and heads east, passing through the Sydney suburbs of Rydalmere, Ermington, West Ryde, Ryde, Gladesville, Drummoyne and Rozelle. It is predominantly three lanes in each direction between Rozelle and Gladesville, and two or three lanes in each direction west of Gladesville. A large number of Busways and Transit Systems bus routes travel along Victoria Road, and during peak hours much of the road includes a dedicated bus lane.

In July 1955, a new four (later five) lane Iron Cove Bridge opened, followed in October 1964 by a new six (later seven) lane Gladesville Bridge, both replacing 1880s built two-lane structures.

In 2011, the Inner West Busway project introduced a tidal flow arrangement between Drummoyne and Rozelle which provides four city bound lanes (including a dedicated bus lane) and two west bound lanes in the morning peak, before reverting to three lanes in each direction at 10am. A barrier transfer machine is used to move the concrete barrier. This also saw a new three-lane Iron Cove Bridge built for out-bound traffic with the existing structure being solely used by inbound traffic.

History
The passing of the Main Roads Act of 1924 through the Parliament of New South Wales provided for the declaration of Main Roads, roads partially funded by the State government through the Main Roads Board (later the Department of Main Roads, and eventually Transport for NSW). Main Road No. 165 was declared along this road on 8 August 1928, from Pyrmont over the Glebe Island Bridge, via Rozelle, Gladesville, along Kissing Point Road via Dundas, and along Pennant Street back along Victoria Road to Parramatta; the alignment along Kissing Point Road via Dundas was realigned to run via West Ryde at a later date, and the eastern end was truncated to end in Rozelle once the Anzac Bridge opened as part of City West Link in December 1995.

Gallery

See also

References

Streets in Sydney
Municipality of Hunter's Hill
City of Parramatta
Inner West Council
City of Ryde